Zerbes is a surname, originally from Homorod, Brașov in what is now Romania. Theories of its origin include a connection to Saint Servatius, or to Cerberus.

People with this surname include:
Michael Zerbes (born 1944), German sprinter
Sarah Zerbes (born 1978), German mathematician

See also
Zerbes Reserve, the playing ground of Doncaster East Football Club
Zerbe (disambiguation)

References